Sigurd Juell Lorentzen (5 August 1916 – 25 January 1979) was a Norwegian judge and civil servant.

He was born in Sunndal, and was a brother of professor Gustav Fredrik Lorentzen. He married judge Lelia
Marie Loe in 1957. They resided in Bærum.

He enrolled as a student in 1934, graduated with the cand.jur. degree in 1938, and worked as a secretary in Trustkontrollkontoret from 1939 to 1940 and in the Norwegian Price Directorate from 1940 to 1945. After a brief time in the Ministry of Finance in 1945, to which he was summoned by Wilhelm Thagaard, he returned to the Price Directorate and remained here until 1949. He was a deputy under-secretary of state in the Ministry of Finance from 1951 to 1960, permanent under-secretary of state in the Ministry of Transport from 1960 to 1972 and a Supreme Court Justice from 1972 to 1979.

When hired as deputy under-secretary in 1951, Lorentzen edged out applicants who were generally believed to be better qualified, especially Einar Grøstad. This was a personal decision by Minister of Finance Trygve Bratteli. Lorentzen was the youngest of the applicants, and the second youngest permanent under-secretary in the Ministry at the time. He was also known to be, as a person, quite similar to Trygve Bratteli. He became quite strong; historian Einar Lie has noted that "in reality", the permanent under-secretary of state Friedrich Georg Nissen did not function "as a real superior to Lorentzen". In 1957, both Grøstad and Lorentzen applied to become the successor of Nissen as permanent under-secretary, the highest position in the Ministry. However, this time Trygve Bratteli chose economist Eivind Erichsen; Grøstad and Lorentzen were both jurists. Einar Lie has called this "likely [...] the only defeat in Lorentzen's own career". Soon, Lorentzen developed a reserved relation to Erichsen as well as Per Kleppe—principally, though, since the latter two were economists and Lorentzen was a jurist. Einar Lie wrote that when Trygve Bratteli brought Lorentzen to the Ministry of Transport, he "solved" a problem. It also paved the way for up-and-coming economist Hermod Skånland.

Lorentzen was also the chairman of the Norwegian Association of Lawyers from 1966 to 1971 and the Norwegian State Educational Loan Fund.

References

1916 births
1979 deaths
Norwegian civil servants
Supreme Court of Norway justices
People from Sunndal